This was the first edition of the tournament since 2013.

Hsu Yu-hsiou won the title after defeating Marc Polmans 6–4, 7–6(7–5) in the final.

Seeds

Draw

Finals

Top half

Bottom half

References

External links
Main draw
Qualifying draw

NSW Open - 1